Robert M. Rodriguez is an American emergency physician working at the San Francisco General Hospital. He is a professor of emergency medicine at the UCSF School of Medicine and was a member of the COVID-19 Advisory Board of U.S. president Joe Biden.

Early life and education 
Rodriguez was born in Brownsville, Texas to a Latino family. He earned his undergraduate degree at University of Notre Dame and a medical degree at Harvard Medical School. Rodriguez completed a 5-year residency in emergency medicine and internal medicine at Ronald Reagan UCLA Medical Center. He developed an interest in the physiology of critically ill patients and completed a 2-year critical care fellowship at Stanford University Medical Center. Rodriguez is board certified in emergency medicine, internal medicine, and critical care medicine.

Career 
Rodriguez is an emergency physician at San Francisco General Hospital and a professor of emergency medicine at the UCSF School of Medicine. In July 2020, Rodriguez treated patients along the Mexico–United States border during the COVID-19 pandemic in Texas. He researched heightened stress and anxiety levels among physicians during the COVID-19 pandemic. In November 2020, he was named to the COVID-19 Advisory Board of President Joe Biden.

References 

Living people
Year of birth missing (living people)
People from Brownsville, Texas
Physicians from Texas
21st-century American physicians
UCSF School of Medicine faculty
University of Notre Dame alumni
American emergency physicians
COVID-19 researchers
American medical researchers
Hispanic and Latino American academics
Hispanic and Latino American physicians
Harvard Medical School alumni